The Money Channel was a TV channel of Realitatea-Caţavencu, owned by Sorin-Ovidiu Vântu.

The Money Channel was the first business TV channel in Romania. It broadcast information about the Stock Exchange in Romania, and also news, mainly economic, but also politics, weather and sport.

External links
 

Business-related television channels
Defunct television channels in Romania
2006 establishments in Romania
2015 disestablishments in Romania
Television channels and stations established in 2006
Television channels and stations disestablished in 2015